Pleomorphomonas koreensis is a Gram-negative, aerobic, nitrogen-fixing, non-spore-forming rod-shaped and non-motile bacterium species from the genus of Pleomorphomonas which has been isolated from soil in Daejeon in Korea.

References

Further reading

External links 
Type strain of Pleomorphomonas koreensis at BacDive -  the Bacterial Diversity Metadatabase

Hyphomicrobiales
Bacteria described in 2006